Kiara Zanon (born August 22, 2002) is an American ice hockey player for Penn State and member of the United States women's national ice hockey team. She was named the Women's Hockey Commissioners Association National Rookie of the Year in 2022.

Playing career
Zanon began her collegiate career for Penn State during the 2020–21 season. During her freshman year, she recorded 10 goals and 20 assists in 21 games. She led the team in points with 30, and led all rookies in the country in points, points per game, assists, and assists per game. She set a program single-season record with a +23 plus–minus rating and a program best nine multi-point games. She was named College Hockey America (CHA) Rookie of the Month three consecutive months in December 2020, January 2021 and February 2021. She was also named the Hockey Commissioners Association Women's National Rookie of the Month in December 2020. Following an outstanding season, she was named to the CHA All-First Team, and All-Rookie Team. She was also awarded the CHA Player of the Year, CHA Rookie of the Year, and the Women's Hockey Commissioners Association National Rookie of the Year. She was also named a Second Team CCM/AHCA All-American and a top-ten finalist for the Patty Kazmaier Award, becoming the first Nittany Lion player to achieve this honor in program history.

During the 2021–22 season in her sophomore year, she recorded thirteen goals and 26 assists in 33 games. She ranked second in the CHA in points with 39, and led the CHA in assists with 26. Following the season was named to the CHA All-First Team. 

On June 1, 2022, Zanon was named a co-captain of the Nittany Lions for the 2022–23 season. On December 4, 2022, Zanon recorded her first career hat-trick in a game against Syracuse, as Penn State set a program record for the most goals scored in a single game. On January 13, 2023, Zanon recorded her 100th career point, becoming the fourth Nittany Lion in program history to reach the milestone. She also became the fastest player in program history to reach the milestone.

International play

Zanon represented the United States at the 2019 IIHF World Women's U18 Championship where she recorded one assist in five games and won a silver medal. She again represented the United States at the 2020 IIHF World Women's U18 Championship, where she recorded one goal and two assists in five games and won a gold medal. She scored the game-winning goal in overtime against Canada in the gold medal game.

Career statistics

Regular season and playoffs

International

References

External links
 

2002 births
Living people
American women's ice hockey forwards
Ice hockey people from New York (state)
Penn State Nittany Lions women's ice hockey players
People from Fairport, New York